Gregory Gardner (born November 21, 1975) is a Canadian ice hockey coach and former goaltender who is the NCAA Division I record-holder for shutouts in a season (as of 2021).

Career
When Niagara University began sponsoring men's ice hockey in 1996, they did so with Gardner as their primary goaltender. The team joined ECAC West for their inaugural season, one of the top conferences in Division III, and performed surprisingly well. Gardner helped the team finish second in the conference but, because the team was in its first season of play, they were ineligible for any postseason play. Both Gardner and the Eagles played even better in year two, with Niagara winning both the ECAC West regular season and Tournament Championships. While Gardner overall numbers were underwhelming, 12 of the team's 27 games had been played against Division I programs. Niagara had done this because the school's plan was to promote the program to Division I the following year.
 	
He played for Team Canada in the 1997 Maccabiah Games in Israel, winning a gold medal.

Gardner got his first taste of D-I hockey in the fall of 1998 and showed that he belonged when he helped Niagara earn a weekend split against the defending NCAA champion, #2 Michigan. He continued to play steady in goal for Niagara, helping the team finish with a winning record. For his final season, Gardner's team became a founding member of College Hockey America and he responded with one of the most stunning seasons in NCAA history. Gardner was in goal for 41 of the team's 42 games and led the nation with 29 wins and a 1.53 goals against average. He also set the NCAA record with 12 shutouts on the season, bringing his career total up to 16. In a stretch of 15 games, beginning in late December, Gardner went 13–0–2 and helped earn Niagara its first ever national ranking. Despite the gaudy totals, Gardner's competition was perceived as weak and he was not named as an All-American. Regardless of the personal slight, Gardner helped the Purple Eagles win the inaugural CHA Tournament and put the team in prime position for an at-large bid.

Because the CHA was a new conference, they did not have an automatic bid into the NCAA Tournament despite having the requisite number of member teams (6). Even though the conssnsus at the time was that the conference was inferior to the other established leagues, the NCAA selection committee could not ignore Niagara's 29–7–4 record and awarded the final western seed to the Purple Eagles. Niagara faced New Hampshire in its first NCAA game and showed they belonged by winning the match. While the Eagles were outshout 18–35, Gardner turned away 34 attempts and led the team to a moderately surprising 4–1 win. While they could not replicate the performance in the second game, falling to the eventual national champions, Gardner had ensured his legacy with the program by giving the Purple Eagles their first (and only as of 2021) 30-win season.

After graduating, Gardner played several years of professional hockey, mostly in the ECHL. His best season came in 2003 when he helped the Mississippi Sea Wolves capture a division championship. Gardner retired as a player in 2006 and immediately returned to college hockey as a coach. He spent 5 seasons as an assistant with his alma mater before moving on to Princeton in 2011. he is currently the associate head coach at Mercyhurst.

Gardner was inducted into the Niagara Athletic Hall of Fame in 2006.

Statistics

Regular season and playoffs

Awards and honors

References

External links

1975 births
Living people
Canadian ice hockey goaltenders
Competitors at the 1997 Maccabiah Games
Dayton Bombers players
Fischtown Pinguins players
Ice hockey people from Ontario
Jewish ice hockey players
Maccabiah Games competitors by sport
Maccabiah Games competitors for Canada
Mississippi Sea Wolves players
Niagara Purple Eagles men's ice hockey players
Sportspeople from Mississauga
Syracuse Crunch players